In continuum mechanics, and in particular in finite element analysis, the Hu–Washizu principle is a variational principle which says that the action

is stationary, where  is the elastic stiffness tensor. The Hu–Washizu principle is used to develop mixed finite element methods. The principle is named after Hu Haichang and Kyūichirō Washizu.

References

Further reading 
 K. Washizu: Variational Methods in Elasticity & Plasticity, Pergamon Press, New York, 3rd edition (1982)
 O. C. Zienkiewicz, R. L. Taylor, J. Z. Zhu : The Finite Element Method: Its Basis and Fundamentals, Butterworth–Heinemann, (2005).

Calculus of variations
Finite element method
Structural analysis
Principles
Continuum mechanics